A list of examples of in vivo transdifferentiation through transfection:
mouse hepatocytes → B cells (Pdx1)
exocrine cells → B cells (Pdx1, Ngn3, and v-maf musculoaponeurotic fibrosarcoma oncogene family protein A)
nonsensory cells → inner hair cells (Atoh1 and MathI)
non cardiogenic mesoderm → cardiomyocytes (Gata4, Tbx5 and Smarcd3 or Baf60c)

Through excision:
B-cell precursors → hematopoietic progenitors(-Pax5)
In adult ovarian follicles, granulosa and thecal cells → functional Sertoli-like and Leydig-like cells (-Foxl1)

See also
Transdifferentiation
Induced stem cells

References

Histology
Induced stem cells